Hulon Stamps (September 15, 1898 – death unknown), alternately spelled "Hulan", and nicknamed "Lefty", was an American Negro league pitcher in the 1920s.

A native of Henry County, Tennessee, Stamps made his Negro leagues debut in 1924 with the Indianapolis ABCs and Memphis Red Sox. He went on to play for Memphis for four more seasons through 1928.

References

External links
 and Seamheads

1898 births
Year of death missing
Place of death missing
Indianapolis ABCs players
Memphis Red Sox players
Baseball pitchers